Eupithecia dodoneata, the oak-tree pug, is a moth of the family Geometridae. The species can be found in Europe. Local occurrences are found in Asia Minor, the Caucasus as well as in Morocco. In the Pyrenees and the Alps, it rises to altitudes of 1000 metres. The species prefers dry oak and oak mixed forests.

The wingspan is 19–22 mm. The ground colour of the forewings is usually light grey, sometimes slightly brownish on dusted. There are several dark grey crosslines  are wavy and often in pairs. The outer cross line near the front edge with a sharp, inward-pointing V. The midfield is brighter in some  specimens and framed by a thin dark band. The black  median stain has an oval shape. The hind wings are slightly lighter than the forewings and have also several dark designs and a small black middle spot.
 Adult caterpillars are brownish and show on the back very clear reddish-brown triangular spots, the tip of which is directed forward.
The pupa is coloured black-brown and equipped with two strong and six thin hook bristles on the cremaster. A reliable determination should be made by specialists, and a genital morphological analysis is also recommended for a certain assignment.

The moths flies from May to June depending on the location.

The larvae feed on Crataegus and Quercus species.

Subspecies
Eupithecia dodoneata dodoneata
Eupithecia dodoneata austrina Herbulot, 1962

Similar species
'Eupithecia abbreviata

References

External links

Oak-tree Pug on UKmoths
Lepiforum.de

Moths described in 1857
dodoneata
Moths of Europe
Taxa named by Achille Guenée